Edwin Tulley Newton  (4 May 1840 – 28 January 1930) was a British paleontologist.

Newton originally worked at handicrafts, but was able to attend Thomas Henry Huxley's lectures and by 1865, was appointed as his assistant. In 1882, he became paleontologist to the "Geologic Survey", a position he retained until 1905. His early work included microscopic sectioning of coal and notable studies on cockroach brains.

Later he did work on chimaeroid fish fossils. In 1893, Newton won the Lyell Medal. He was president of the Geologists' Association in 1896–1898 and president of the Palaeontographical Society from 1921 to 1928. Newton was elected Fellow of the Geological Society in 1873, Zoological Society of London in 1885, and Fellow of the Royal Society in 1893.

References

External links 
 
 
 

1840 births
1930 deaths
English palaeontologists
Fellows of the Geological Society of London
Fellows of the Royal Society
Fellows of the Zoological Society of London
Lyell Medal winners
Presidents of the Geologists' Association